Schrumpf is a surname of German origin, originating as a nickname for a wrinkly person. Notable people with the surname include:

Augusta Schrumpf (1813-1900), Norwegian dramatic actress and operatic soprano
Jan Schrumpf (1921-2007), Dutch professional footballer
Mildred Brown Schrumpf (1903-2001), American home economist, food educator, and author

See also
Schrimpf
Schrempf (surname)